The KTX-I, also known as the TGV-K or Korail Class 100000, is a South Korean high speed train class based on the French TGV Réseau. The 20-car formation of the trainsets without restaurant car is optimized for high capacity. The 46 trainsets were built partly in France and partly in South Korea in the framework of a technology transfer agreement, which was the basis for further domestic high-speed train development in South Korea.

Korail uses the name of KTX as the official name of KTX-I. The name of KTX-I is derived to distinguish KTX-Sancheon, which was formerly called as KTX-II, but it is not the official name for this rolling stock.

The high-speed rail service of South Korea's national rail carrier Korail, Korea Train Express (KTX), started with the KTX-I. The operational reliability of the trains was improved over time with better maintenance and minor modifications.

History

In 1991, bids were called for the supply and technology transfer of the core system technology, encompassing the catenary, signalling and rolling stock, for a South Korean high speed train service. On August 26, 1991, three competitors submitted initial bids: consortia led by GEC-Alsthom (today Alstom), one of the builders of France's TGV/LGV system; Siemens, one of the builders of Germany's ICE; and Mitsubishi, one of the builders of Japan's Shinkansen. After five rounds of evaluation, the French and German consortia submitted final bids on June 15, 1993. The Korea High Speed Rail Construction Authority (KHSRCA) announced that the GEC-Alsthom-led consortium was the preferred bidder on August 20, 1993, and the contract was signed on June 14, 1994.

Part of the core system contract won by GEC-Alsthom and its South Korean subsidiary Eukorail were the first high-speed trains in South Korea, the KTX-I, which were based on the TGV Réseau.  The carbody of the first end car was manufactured in January 1996, the first full train was completed and began testing in France in December 1997, and was shipped to South Korea in March 1998. The first test run in South Korea took place in December 1999. In June 2000, the speed of  had been achieved, regular testing at that speed started in November 2000, after all of the 12 sets built by Alstom in France have been delivered to South Korea. In line with the core system contract condition that over 50% of the added value has to come from South Korea after technology transfer, the remaining 34 of the 46 trainsets ordered were built under license by Rotem in South Korea itself. The first carbody manufactured in Korea was completed in October 1999, the first complete train was rolled out in April 2002, and all trains were delivered by December 2003.

From the beginning of January 2004 until the start of regular service on April 1, 2004, 25–28 of the trains were in operation each day when the KTX system was put under intensive test operation to prepare all system components and personnel for regular service.

Technical details

Like all TGV variants, the KTX-I is a permanently coupled trainset that consists of two traction heads, that is powered end cars carrying no passengers, flanking a fixed set of passenger cars or trailers that are articulated with Jacobs bogies between them.  Though the KTX-I is based on the TGV Réseau, it has 18 instead of 8 passenger cars, making them the longest member of the TGV family with a monobloc configuration, that is a single set of articulated cars. The two normal (non-Jacobs) bogies next to the traction heads under the two extreme passenger cars are motorised, like on the TGV Sud-Est. Further traits differentiating the KTX-I from all European variants are the supply voltage frequency of 60 Hz (instead of 50 Hz), rotating seats in the First Class sections, the lack of any bar or restaurant cars. Original plans in 1993 proposed a new "showel nose" design, with the underside of the nose closer to the track, for better aerodynamics in tunnels; however, the final design was only a slightly modified version of another TGV export version, the AVE Class 100 for Spain.

The trains are pressure-sealed to reduce passenger discomfort from pressure variations during tunnel passages. All passenger compartments are equipped with ceiling-mounted video displays, on-board audio systems, phones and vending machines.

Train details
Each set is formed of two power cars and 18 coaches:

Operation

Services

The KTX was launched with KTX-I trains starting revenue service on April 1, 2004 on two routes: the Seoul–Busan Gyeongbu KTX, then using the completed sections of the Gyeongbu High Speed Railway until Daegu, and the upgraded old Gyeongbu Line from there; and the Seoul–Mokpo or Seoul–Gwangju Honam KTX, using the Gyeongbu HSR until Daejeon and the upgraded old Honam Line from there.  From June 2007 until October 2010, some trains in Gyeongbu KTX service ran along an alternative route leaving the Gyeongbu HSR between Daejeon and Dongdaegu to serve Gimcheon and Gumi before the opening of an extra station for the two cities on the high-speed line. From November 1, 2010, most Gyeongbu KTX services began to use the new Daegu–Busan section of the Gyeongbu HSR, some trains remained on the Gyeongbu Line on that section, and additional trains began to use the Gyeongbu Line on the Seoul–Daejeon section to serve Suwon.

From 2006, the first car of KTX-I trains functions as a moving cinema during selected services.

Technical issues

Most of the operation irregularities after the start of KTX service concerned the rolling stock, but also signalling, power glitches and track problems. From the first month of service to the fifth, the number of all operation irregularities decreased from 28 to 8, among which the number of rolling stock related incidents decreased from 18 to 5. Causes for breakdowns in the first years of operation involved inexperienced staff and insufficient inspection during maintenance.  The failure rate decreased sharply by the fifth year of operation.

In an investigation report released in October 2006, representatives from the Grand National Party expressed concern about the practice to use parts from other trains for spare parts, but Korail stated that that is standard practice in case of urgency with no safety effect, and the supply of spare parts is secured. Korail is also conducting a localisation program to develop replacements for various imported parts, starting with auxiliary inverters and brake cylinders, and continuing with other auxiliary electrical equipment in the passenger cars and yaw dampers.

On June 13, 2007, near Cheongdo on the upgraded Daegu–Busan section, a damper acting between two cars of a KTX-I train got free at one end due to a loose screw and hit the trackbed, throwing up ballast that hit cars and caused bruises to two people on the parallel road, and generating smoke inside the train's passenger compartment. The train was stopped by emergency braking when passengers noticed the smoke. On November 3, 2007, an arriving KTX-I train collided with a parked KTX-I train inside Busan Station, resulting in material damage of 10 billion won to the two trains and light injuries to two persons. The accident happened because the driver has fallen asleep and disabled the train protection system, while the station dispatcher was absent from his observation point without notice. The driver was tried, convicted and fined 10 million won. The railway union noted that the driver had 2 hours and 29 minutes for sleeping between two shifts, and criticised single driver operation in conjunction with short rest times.

The noise level in the trains during tunnel passages was subject to passenger complaints. Korail then retrofitted all trains with the wider mud flaps until May 2006.

Successive types with localised technology

The Korean rail industry used the know-how gained in the technology transfer for the KTX-I as the basis to develop the experimental train HSR-350x, which in turn led to orders for a Rotem-built commercial high speed train, the KTX-II.

See also

 List of high speed trains
 Eurotrain
 HEMU-400X
 Tilting Train Express
 Train to Busan Movie about a zombie outbreak on a KTX train

References

High-speed trains of South Korea
High-speed trains
Korea Train Express
TGV trainsets
Alstom multiple units
Hyundai Rotem multiple units
Electric multiple units with locomotive-like power cars
25 kV AC multiple units